Fourth Baptist Christian School, a ministry of Fourth Baptist Church, is a private Christian school located in Plymouth, Minnesota.   Fourth Baptist Christian School is a member of the American Association of Christian Schools.  The school includes pre-K through 12th grade, totaling over 300 students.

History
In 1966, Fourth Christian School opened its doors for the first time in Minneapolis, Minnesota.  In 1998, they moved to their current location in Plymouth, MN.   

Fourth Baptist Christian School has had several principals throughout the course of its history.  These men and women have been the Administrators of Fourth Baptist Christian School:

1966-1971: Louise Refsell.
1971-1980: Dr. Ralph Mawdsley
1980-1982: Nadine Davey
1983-1990: Pastor Daniel Bjonke
1990-1998: Pastor Stephen Siedler
1998-2010: Jon Tuttle
2010–present: Alan Hodak

Facility and Academics
Fourth Baptist Christian School occupies the larger east wing of Fourth Baptist Church of Plymouth, Minnesota.  Central Baptist Theological Seminary of Minneapolis and WCTS Radio occupy the smaller west wing of the building.  The school wing includes a large, full-size gymnasium, a full, well-equipped science laboratory, a second, smaller science lab, a well equipped computer lab, a home economics lab including 5 complete kitchens, a fully equipped wood shop, an art room, a large music room, and 2 private music practice rooms.

Fourth Baptist Christian School provides a high quality academic program throughout all grade levels.  Lower elementary grades use primarily the A Beka Book curriculum, the upper elementary primarily use a mix of the A Beka Book, BJU Press, and Saxon Math curricula.  The secondary classes use primarily the BJU curriculum, as well as the Saxon math curriculum, Positive Action for Christ Bible curriculum, and several other minor curriculum to enhance the main curriculum.  The school is currently in the process of receiving accreditation through the American Association of Christian Schools, and is on pace to receive accreditation in 2013.

Fine Arts
The Elementary music program includes general music classes, as well as vocal choirs, and band and handbells for the upper grades. In the secondary levels, there is a music program which includes Jr. and Sr. High choirs, Mixed Ensemble, Men’s and Women’s ensembles, 3 handbell choirs, and Jr. and Sr. High bands.  Private piano lessons are also available to all students during the school day.

Senior high students also have the opportunity to compete in the Minnesota Association of Christian Schools Fine Arts Festival which is held at Fourth Baptist Christian school in April.  During this students can compete musically with the larger ensembles and choirs as well as in small groups and as soloists.  Students can also compete in other categories such as art, photography, home economics, and a science fair.  Students can also take part in academic testing, and the awards for the testing are given out along with the fine arts awards at the end of the Fine Arts Festival.  Students are also able to compete at the Minnesota Association of Christian Schools Speech and Bible Festival held in March at Woodcrest Baptist Academy.

Athletics
Fourth Baptist Christian School offers an athletic program for the secondary levels.  For men, there are soccer, basketball, and baseball teams for both Jr. and Sr. High levels.  For women, there are volleyball and basketball teams for both Jr. and Sr. High levels.  Junior high teams compete in the North Suburban Parochial School League (NSPSL), and the junior varsity and varsity teams compete in the Minnesota Association of Christian Schools.

External links
 
 http://www.fourthbaptist.org/

Christian schools in Minnesota
Schools in Hennepin County, Minnesota
Educational institutions established in 1966
1966 establishments in Minnesota